Allido Records is a record label and production company. The company was started by DJ and producer Mark Ronson and Rich Kleiman, a television, internet and music businessman. The label got its name "Allido" from the Stevie Wonder song "All I Do". Rapper Saigon was the first artist signed to Allido Records, but left soon after, and is now signed to Just Blaze's Fort Knox Entertainment. In conjunction with Clive Davis’ J Records, Allido signed Chicago-based rapper Rhymefest, who is best known as the co-writer for Kanye West's Jesus Walks. Rhymefest's first album, under Allido, was released July 11, 2006, under the title of Blue Collar. Allido has also signed Australian-born soul singer Daniel Merriweather. Other projects in the works from Ronson and Kleiman are the soundtrack to Gap's latest ad campaign as well as Jay-Z's movie, Fade to Black. Allido's most recent signing is Washington, D.C. hip hop artist Wale.

The label was distributed by J Records prior to J's dissolution in 2011, in which Allido became an independent label.

Artists
Daniel Merriweather
The Rumblestrips
Surreal
Mark Ronson
Wale

See also
 List of record labels

References

American record labels
Hip hop record labels
Entertainment companies
Record labels